Verifier can refer to:

 A machine, such as the IBM 056, used in two pass verification
 The Verifier, a type of fuel gauge

See also 
 Verification (disambiguation)